The 1936 St. Louis Cardinals season was the team's 55th season in St. Louis, Missouri and its 45th season in the National League. The Cardinals went 87–67 during the season and finished 2nd in the National League.

Regular season

Season standings

Record vs. opponents

Notable transactions 
 May 24, 1936: Johnny Vergez was purchased by the Cardinals from the Philadelphia Phillies.

Roster

Player stats

Batting

Starters by position 
Note: Pos = Position; G = Games played; AB = At bats; H = Hits; Avg. = Batting average; HR = Home runs; RBI = Runs batted in

Other batters 
Note: G = Games played; AB = At bats; H = Hits; Avg. = Batting average; HR = Home runs; RBI = Runs batted in

Pitching

Starting pitchers 
Note: G = Games pitched; IP = Innings pitched; W = Wins; L = Losses; ERA = Earned run average; SO = Strikeouts

Other pitchers 
Note: G = Games pitched; IP = Innings pitched; W = Wins; L = Losses; ERA = Earned run average; SO = Strikeouts

Relief pitchers 
Note: G = Games pitched; W = Wins; L = Losses; SV = Saves; ERA = Earned run average; SO = Strikeouts

Farm system 

LEAGUE CHAMPIONS: Columbus (Sally), Union CityNew Philadelphia club folded, May 25, 1936

References

External links
1936 St. Louis Cardinals at Baseball Reference
1936 St. Louis Cardinals  at Baseball Almanac

St. Louis Cardinals seasons
Saint Louis Cardinals season
St Louis Cardinals